Patrick Netzer is a Swiss curler.

At the national level, he is a 1997 Swiss men's champion curler.

Teams

References

External links

Living people
Swiss male curlers
Swiss curling champions
Year of birth missing (living people)
Place of birth missing (living people)